Staraya Ivantsovka is a rural locality (a selo) in Zavolzhskoye Rural Settlement, Pallasovsky District, Volgograd Oblast, Russia. The population was 555 as of 2010. There are 8 streets.

Geography 
Staraya Ivantsovka is located on the Caspian Depression, on the right bank of the Torgun River, 16 km west of Pallasovka (the district's administrative centre) by road. Novaya Ivantsovka is the nearest rural locality.

References 

Rural localities in Pallasovsky District